The Flitzer Z-21 or Staaken Flitzer is a British amateur-built aircraft, designed by Lynn Williams and produced by Flitzer Sportplanes of Aberdare, Wales. The aircraft is supplied as plans for amateur construction.

In the late 1990s it was also marketed as plans and in kit form by Bell Aeromarine of Leicester, UK.

Design and development
The Z-21 is a single-seat, open cockpit 1920s-style biplane with fixed conventional landing gear with spoked wheels and a single engine in tractor configuration.

The aircraft is made from wood, with its flying surfaces covered in doped aircraft fabric. The aircraft was designed for the  Volkswagen air-cooled engine, but other variants have been developed that use a variety of engines, including the  Rotec R2800 radial engine.

Further planned developments include a tandem two seater, a four aileron version and a lighter weight version.

Operational history
In August 2014 there were eleven Flitzers registered in the United Kingdom.

Specifications (Z-21)

References

External links

Homebuilt aircraft
Single-engined tractor aircraft
Biplanes
Welsh brands